Yakah Darakht(), also known as Yakadarakht, is a village in Kabul Province, in central-eastern Afghanistan.

See also 
Kabul Province

References

Populated places in Kabul Province